Niels Olsen (born 28 December 1948) is a Danish rower. He competed in the men's coxed pair event at the 1964 Summer Olympics.

References

External links
 

1948 births
Living people
Danish male rowers
Olympic rowers of Denmark
Rowers at the 1964 Summer Olympics
People from Faxe Municipality
Sportspeople from Region Zealand